is a Japanese manga series written by Ryō Kurashina and illustrated by Nao Kurebayashi. It was serialized in Shueisha's seinen manga magazine Business Jump from 2004 to 2008, with its chapters collected in twelve tankōbon volumes. A sequel, Jōō Virgin, was serialized in the same magazine from 2009 to 2010. Jōō''' tells the story of a young girl's challenge at the "Jōō Grand Prix" contest, in which the best kyabakura hostess is promised to win 100,000,000 yen (roughly 1 million US dollars). A television drama adaptation of the same name was broadcast for three seasons on TV Tokyo from 2005 to 2010.

Media
Manga
Written by Ryō Kurashina and illustrated by Nao Kurebayashi, Jōō was serialized in Shueisha's seinen manga magazine Business Jump from August 18, 2004, to February 1, 2008. Its chapters were collected in twelve tankōbon'' volumes, released from March 18, 2005, to March 19, 2008.

A sequel, was serialized in the same magazine from 2009 to 2010. Its chapters were collected in five volumes, released from October 2, 2009, to September 17, 2010.

References

External links
 Official homepage for "Jōō" on BS Japan
 Official homepage for "Jōō Virgin" on TV Tokyo
 Official homepage for "Jōō 3" on TV Tokyo
 

Seinen manga
Shueisha franchises
Shueisha manga